Geevarghese Mar Philexinos is a Metropolitan of the Malankara Orthodox Syrian Church.

Early life
H. G. Geevarghese Mar Philexinos was born on 30 May 1972.

Metropolitan
He was elected as the Metropolitan candidate on 25 February 2022 at the Malankara Association held at Kolenchery. He was consecrated as Metropolitan on 28 July 2022 at St. Mary's Orthodox Cathedral, Pazhanji.

References

1972 births
Living people
Malankara Orthodox Syrian Church bishops